Senator Beard may refer to:

Edna Beard (1877–1928), Vermont State Senate
John Beard (politician) (1797–1876), North Carolina State Senate
Malcolm E. Beard (1919–2019), Florida State Senate